Dowbiggin is a surname derived from the historic locality of Dowbiggin in Sedbergh, England.

Notable people with the surname Dowbiggin include:

Bruce Dowbiggin, Canadian author and sports broadcaster 
Ian Dowbiggin (born 1952), Canadian historian
Lancelot Dowbiggin (1685–1759), English architect
Rebecca Dowbiggin (born 1983), British rower

References

English toponymic surnames